David Nalbandian defeated the defending champion Roger Federer in the final, 1–6, 6–3, 6–3 to win the singles tennis title at the 2007 Madrid Open. Nalbandian achieved the rare feat of defeating the world's top three players in the same tournament, also defeating No. 2 Rafael Nadal and No. 3 Novak Djokovic en route to the title. He joined Djokovic and Boris Becker in achieving the feat, and became the only player to defeat all of the Big Three in the same tournament.

Seeds
All seeds receive a bye into the second round.

Draw

Finals

Top half

Section 1

Section 2

Bottom half

Section 3

Section 4

Qualifying

Qualifying seeds
{{columns-list|colwidth=30em|
  Ernests Gulbis (first round)
  Óscar Hernández (qualifying competition, lucky loser)  Agustín Calleri (qualified)
  Stefan Koubek (qualified)
  Kristof Vliegen (qualifying competition)  Frank Dancevic (qualifying competition)  Robby Ginepri (qualified)
  Nicolás Massú (qualifying competition)  Marc Gicquel (qualified)
  Vince Spadea (first round)  Andrei Pavel (qualified)
  Simone Bolelli (qualifying competition)}}

Qualifiers

Lucky loser
  Óscar Hernández

Special exempt
  Stanislas Wawrinka (reached the final at Vienna)''

Qualifying draw

First qualifier

Second qualifier

Third qualifier

Fourth qualifier

Fifth qualifier

Sixth qualifier

References

External links
Main Draw
Qualifying draw
ITF tournament profile

Singles